Tatiana Capote Abdel (born August 15, 1962 in Havana, Cuba) is a Cuba-born Venezuelan telenovela actress and former beauty queen.

Miss World
She grew up in Caracas, Venezuela and became the official representative of Venezuela to the 1979 Miss World pageant held in London, United Kingdom on November 15, 1979.

When competing at the Miss World 1979, Capote popped out of her swimsuit during a preview of the final judging. Pageant organizer, Eric Morley, hastily adjusted her swimsuit.

Filmography

References

External links
Miss Venezuela Official Website
Miss World Official Website

1962 births
Living people
Actresses from Caracas
Miss World 1979 delegates
Miss Venezuela World winners
Venezuelan telenovela actresses
Cuban emigrants to Venezuela
Actresses from Havana